Mangonia Park is a Tri-Rail commuter rail station in Mangonia Park, Florida. This is the system's northernmost station. The station is located on 45th Street (CR 702), just west of Australian Avenue (CR 704A). There are 273 parking spaces at the station.

History
The Mangonia Park station was opened on October 28, 1996, along a former Seaboard Air Line Railroad line, and was the first station to serve the community.

Every January, Palm Beach County Public School safety patrol boards charter an Amtrak train at the station for their annual trip to Washington, D.C. The train operates with a Silver Meteor consist plus several Horizon coaches. On the days this train operates, the northbound or southbound Silver Meteors are actually canceled since the train uses the equipment that would normally be used for those runs. This is the only time an Amtrak operated train stops at this station.

Station layout
Mangonia Park is served by routes 20, 31, and 33 of Palm Tran, the county bus system. These buses serve The Gardens Mall, Downtown West Palm Beach, the VA Medical Center, and Cross County Plaza. The station has two side platforms, with buses and parking adjacent to the Track 1 platform.

References

External links
South Florida Regional Transportation Authority - Mangonia Park station
 Station from Google Maps Street View

Tri-Rail stations in Palm Beach County, Florida
Railway stations in the United States opened in 1996